The Leeds City Council elections were held on Thursday, 2 May 1996, with a third of the council up for election.

The Conservatives suffered another routing, although with a less impressive Labour vote and a slight recovery in their own vote, were able to hold on to three seats. Labour furthered their stranglehold on the council with an additional seven gains, with all but Burmantofts (Liberal Democrat) and Pudsey South (Independent) from the Tories. As a result of the gains, those two wards - along with the Tory losses of Aireborough, Halton, Morley North and Weetwood wards - were now represented entirely by Labour (a first for most). The other Labour gain was snatching the remaining Tory seat in the former Tory-Liberal battleground of  Otley & Wharfedale.

The Lib Dems offset their loss to Labour in Burmantofts with gains from the Tories in Horsforth and the newly three-way marginal North ward. The results, however, were a disappointment to the Lib Dems - evidenced by their poor performance in Otley & Wharfedale, and a vote sunk to their 1992 level. Another parallel to the 1992 election was the slump in overall turnout to a record low.

Peter Kersting's decision to forgo defending his seat for Pudsey South seen the absence of Independents from the council for the first time since 1983. The Greens advanced further into a respectable second place in Wortley, in contrast to the stagnant fortunes of the Liberals and the weakened support for the sole Militant Labour candidate.

Election result

|- style="background-color:#F9F9F9"
! style="background-color: " |
| Militant Labour
| align="right" | 0
| align="right" | 0
| align="right" | 0
| align="right" | 0
| align="right" | 0.0
| align="right" | 0.1
| align="right" | 232
| align="right" | -0.1
|-

This result had the following consequences for the total number of seats on the council after the elections:

Ward results

|- style="background-color:#F9F9F9"
! style="background-color: " |
| Militant Labour
| Chris Hill
| align="right" | 232
| align="right" | 7.6
| align="right" | -2.6
|-

By-elections between 1996 and 1998

|- style="background-color:#F9F9F9"
! style="background-color: " |
| Militant Labour
| 
| align="right" | 44 
| align="right" | 2.0
| align="right" | +2.0
|-

References

1996 English local elections
1996
1990s in Leeds